The name Llach may refer to:

 Lluís Llach also known as Lluís Llach i Grande, born 1948, a Catalan musician
 Lucas Llach, born 1973, an Argentine economist and historian